Young Americans for Liberty (YAL) is a conservative, libertarian student activism organization headquartered in Austin, Texas. Formed in 2008 in the aftermath of the Ron Paul 2008 presidential campaign, YAL establishes chapters on high school and college campuses across the United States, for the purpose of "advancing liberty on campus and in American electoral politics."

YAL is active on nearly 400 college and university campuses, representing thousands of students.

History
YAL was founded in 2008 at the end of Congressman Ron Paul's first presidential campaign. Paul's candidacy inspired students to organize on-campus under the banner of Students for Ron Paul. After the 2008 presidential election in November, the movement continued, soon becoming Young Americans for Liberty.

On May 23, 2019, YAL announced it would be moving its headquarters to Austin from Arlington, Virginia, saying that the group "doesn't belong" in Washington, D.C. due to its "toxic environment," and that it was a "rapidly growing organization" that needed more space in its headquarters.

In January 2021, YAL removed its president, Cliff Maloney, for serious allegations of sexual misconduct towards YAL employees.

In May 2021, Lauren Daugherty became YAL's new executive director. Former Maine State Senator Eric Brakey assumed the role of senior spokesperson, while Sean Themea became YAL's chief of staff.

Activities 

In March 2011, 78 YAL chapters across 32 states organized a student protest of the national debt. Each chapter constructed a 40-foot debt clock and placed it in the middle of their campus.

In April 2014, two YAL students at the University of Hawaii filed a federal lawsuit after they were prevented from handing out copies of the US constitution.

Beginning in 2009, YAL hosted annual National Conventions in Arlington, Virginia. More than 300 students attended the 2014 convention. Speakers included U.S Senator Rand Paul and former U.S. Representative Ron Paul, with a video address by Glenn Greenwald. Speakers at the 2016 convention included speakers Ron Paul and U.S. Representative Justin Amash, Judge Andrew Napolitano, and David Boaz of the Cato Institute.

In September 2016, three YAL students passed out pocket constitutions on a public walkway at Kellogg Community College (KCC) in Battle Creek, Michigan. The students were approached by Drew Hutchinson, the school's Manager of Student Life, and told to shut down the event on grounds that it violated the school's "speech permit policy." After refusing to do so, the students were arrested by campus police and jailed for over seven hours.

YAL and the Alliance Defending Freedom (ADF) subsequently filed suit. Meanwhile, KCC's speech restrictions remained in place until August 2017, when the school was ordered to pay $55,000 in damages and attorney's fees. Additionally, the school agreed to adopt a new Freedom of Expression policy, "[making] it clear that any individual or group can engage in non-commercial expressive activities, including speeches, demonstrations, vigils, and the distribution of informational materials, in common areas on the campus during periods that the College facilities are open to the general public."

Since the onset of the COVID-19 pandemic, YAL has pushed back against government mandates that "[infringe] on civil liberties." The organization's Hazlitt Coalition, a network of 178 legislators from 37 states, introduced dozens of bills opposing proof-of-vaccination requirements. According to Themea, "The idea of having to carry around your health papers to go to the grocery store is something out of an Orwell novel."

In May 2021, YAL helped organize a protest against the COVID-19 vaccine requirement at Rutgers University. Organized by Rutgers junior and YAL state chair Sara Razi, the protest brought together hundreds of "medical freedom activists." The Rutgers protest was covered by CNBC, Forbes, The Guardian, and other news outlets. That same month, YAL and the ADF threatened legal action against Skidmore College after a YAL chapter was not approved on campus for political reasons. Skidmore student Hannah Davis claimed to be the victim of a "cancel culture campaign", which led YAL and the ADF to accuse Skidmore of violating consumer protection law.

In total, YAL has fought COVID-19 vaccine and mask mandates on 23 college campuses, such as Rutgers, Virginia Tech University, and the University of Colorado Boulder. YAL has circulated petitions opposing COVID-related rules on different campuses, such as Virginia Tech. According to the YAL, the organization "is not anti-vaccine, but rather anti-vaccine mandate at taxpayer-funded academic institutions." Several students affiliated with YAL have spoken to the mainstream media, arguing for vaccination as a "personal choice."

YAL is an outspoken critic of gun-control legislation, such as "red flag" laws proposed by President Biden and other Democrats. The organization also opposes "Critical race theory" education at public schools. YAL is active on social media, often attacking Democratic Party officials. The organization also publishes a quarterly magazine called "The American Revolution."

Controversies

In a Facebook post perceived by YAL chapter leaders as an official blacklisting of Breitbart News tech editor Milo Yiannopoulos in May 2016, YAL National Field Director Ty Hicks urged chapter leaders not to invite the conservative firebrand to speak at their events. This came as a result of the YAL chapter at the University of California, Santa Barbara defying a regional field director's instructions to prohibit Yiannopoulos from promoting presidential candidate Donald Trump when he spoke at the university – which she believed could jeopardize the national organization's 501(c)3 non-profit status. The event proceeded with Yiannopoulos asking audience members to address a cardboard cutout of Trump, and chapter members wearing pro-Trump clothing as they hand-carried Yiannopoulos into the event. YAL's president at the time, Cliff Maloney, said Hicks' post did not represent an official YAL position and that "our relationship with Milo remains unchanged." The group's association with Yiannopoulos and others caused Wichita State University to reject the formation of a YAL chapter on campus.

In February 2017 at Students for Liberty's International Students for Liberty Conference (ISFLC) in Washington, D.C., several students affiliated with YAL chapters organized to bring white supremacist Richard Spencer to the hotel where the conference was being held. Spencer and the YAL chapter members were confronted by conference attendees and were removed from the conference.

In 2018, the Iowa State YAL chapter invited the white nationalist figure Nick Fuentes to speak at the Rose-Hulman Institute of Technology.

A few YAL members and chapter leaders have been involved in the American Identity Movement, formerly known as Identity Evropa. In June 2019, Right Wing Watch ran an article noting that university student Richard Golgart Jr. was an "officer" of the University of Nevada, Reno's YAL chapter. An article later in the year by the school newspaper, The Nevada Sagebrush, confirmed the story. An exposé by Sludge found that another Identity Evropa member, Derek Magill, served as president of the YAL chapter at the University of Michigan. The same report also revealed that Alex Witoslawski, another well-known white nationalist activist, "spent six months as the Illinois state chair of Young Americans for Liberty." 

On January 8, 2021, several women came out with allegations of sexual misconduct while at YAL. As a result of the allegations, YAL subsequently announced that Cliff Maloney had been terminated from employment within the organization effective immediately after a decision by the board of directors. On April 26, 2022, Cliff Maloney was arrested and arraigned in Pennsylvania on charges of drugging and raping a woman on University of Pittsburgh Johnstown's campus in 2013.

Operation Win at the Door 
In 2018, YAL launched Operation Win at the Door. Maloney claimed that the project's goal would be to "build the bench" by electing 250 state legislators by the end of 2022.

YAL's "Hazlitt Coalition," a network of libertarian state legislators around the country, oversaw more than 170 members from nearly 40 states in 2021. The coalition filed 25 bills defending people's rights against COVID-19 protocols.

As of November 2022, there are more than 300 Hazlitt members in the coalition, many of them under the age of 40. The Hazlitt Coalition doubled in size between 2021 and 2022. According to Daugherty, the Hazlitt Coalition and its allies made 88 million Americans "more free" in 2021, and over 91 million in 2022. One of the coalition's policy priorities is COVID-19 vaccine choice, in addition to free speech and gun rights, among others.

References

External links
 
 Young Americans for Liberty Foundation: Organizational Profile – National Center for Charitable Statistics (Urban Institute)
 Young Americans for Liberty, Inc.: Organizational Profile – National Center for Charitable Statistics (Urban Institute)
 

Ron Paul
Student political organizations in the United States
Organizations established in 2008
Political youth organizations in the United States
Libertarian organizations based in the United States
Conservative organizations in the United States
Political activism
2008 establishments in the United States